Rzeczyca may refer to the following places:

Poland

Kuyavian-Pomeranian Voivodeship 
Rzeczyca, Kuyavian-Pomeranian Voivodeship, village in Gmina Piotrków Kujawski, Radziejów County

Łódź Voivodeship 
 Gmina Rzeczyca, administrative district in Tomaszów Mazowiecki County
Rzeczyca, Poddębice County, village in Gmina Zadzim, Poddębice County
Rzeczyca, Gmina Rzeczyca, village in Tomaszów Mazowiecki County

Lower Silesian Voivodeship 
Rzeczyca, Polkowice County, village in Gmina Grębocice
Rzeczyca, Środa Śląska County, village in Gmina Środa Śląska

Lublin Voivodeship 
Rzeczyca, Biała Podlaska County, village in Gmina Międzyrzec Podlaski, Biała Podlaska County
Rzeczyca, Puławy County, village in Gmina Kazimierz Dolny
Rzeczyca, Gmina Ulhówek, village in Tomaszów Lubelski County

Lubusz Voivodeship 
Rzeczyca, Krosno Odrzańskie County, village in Gmina Maszewo
Rzeczyca, Świebodzin County, village in Gmina Świebodzin

Masovian Voivodeship 
Rzeczyca, Otwock County, settlement in Gmina Sobienie-Jeziory

West Pomeranian Voivodeship 
Rzeczyca, West Pomeranian Voivodeship, village in Gmina Tuczno, Wałcz County

Belarus 
 Rzeczyca, Polish name for Rechytsa, city in the Gomel Region

See also 
 Rečica (disambiguation) (Slovene form)
 Rēzekne, a city in the Rēzekne River valley in Latgale region of eastern Latvia